Karl Wilhelm (Vasily Georgievich) Brandt (Willy Brandt) (1869 – February 2, 1923) was a German-Russian trumpeter, pedagogue, and composer. He is considered the founder of the Russian trumpet school.

Life 

Karl Wilhelm Brandt was born and educated in Coburg, Saxe-Coburg and Gotha, now part of Germany. Between 1887 and 1890, he worked alternatively in the spa orchestra in Bad Oeynhausen and in Helsinki. He was active in the Helsinki Philharmonic Society, now the Helsinki Philharmonic Orchestra, under Robert Kajanus. In 1890, he changed his name to Vassily Georgyevich and moved to Moscow, Russia.

The opening of the Saratov Conservatory in September 1912 drew Vassily Brandt to Saratov for the remainder of his life. He spoke Russian quite poorly, often relying on demonstration for musical instruction. He died on February 2, 1923, purportedly as the result of a vaccination.

Career 

Vassily Brandt became principal trumpet of the Bolshoi Theatre in 1890 and became first cornet in 1903. He succeeded Theodor Richter (1826–1901) as the second ever trumpet professor of the Moscow Conservatory in 1900, and also taught band orchestration there. In Moscow, he was part of the Russian Musical Society and toured as part of a brass quartet with members of the Bolshoi Theatre. He conducted for the Alexandrovsky Military College military band.

Brandt joined the faculty of the newly established Saratov Conservatory in 1912 as the first professor of trumpet. His fellow brass quartet member Ivan Lipaev made a similar move. There, he managed and conducted the conservatory orchestra in addition to playing as the principal trumpet. He taught using the Arban method and his own compositions.

Influence 

Following the death of Brandt, Konstantin Listov composed Funeral Fanfare for his departed teacher. Brandt's 34 Orchestral Etudes (34 Studies for Trumpet) is an important study material for modern trumpet players. His Last Etudes (The Last Studies) serve a similar purpose. His two Concert Pieces (Konzertstücke Opp. 11–12) for trumpet and piano are also widely performed today. Country Pictures is a notable quartet for trumpets or horns from him. Several of his compositions and etude books are published by International Music Company.

Among his students are Pyotr Lyamin (1884–1968) who succeeded Brandt as a professor at the Saratov Conservatory; Pavel Klochkov (1884–1966) who was an early Russian recording artist; Vladimir Drucker (1898–1974) who was a principal trumpet with the Los Angeles Philharmonic; and Mikhail Tabakov (1877–1956) who became professor at the Moscow Conservatory.

References

External links
 

1869 births
1923 deaths
20th-century trumpeters
German composers
Academic staff of Moscow Conservatory
Academic staff of Saratov Conservatory
Russian composers
Russian male composers
Russian classical trumpeters